The 2001 K League was the 19th season of K League. It kicked off on June 17, and was finished on 28 October.

League table

Top scorers

Awards

Main awards

Best XI

Source:

See also
 2001 Korean League Cup
 2001 Korean FA Cup

References

External links
 RSSSF

K League seasons
1
South Korea
South Korea